The Heliocentric Worlds of Sun Ra, Volume Two is a 1965 recording by the jazz musician Sun Ra and his Solar Arkestra. Where Volume One of the Heliocentric Worlds series had predominantly featured short abstract pieces, Volume Two features longer pieces performed by a smaller group, making it closer in spirit to the contemporaneous The Magic City, released on Ra's own Saturn label. The record has been widely bootlegged, some versions of which were retitled The Sun Myth.

The album was re-released on CD by ZYX-Music (ESP 1017–2) in the 1990s.

The songs

"The Sun Myth" is constructed around the intertwining of Ronnie Boykins's bowed bass and Ra's electronic keyboard. These predominantly low sounds contrast sharply with the interlude commentaries from the other Arkestra members. A rare alternative version – also on ESP, and with the same catalogue number – overlays African singing at the beginning and end of the piece.

"A House of Beauty" is a feature for piccolo, keyboards and bowed bass, which transforms into a piano and plucked bass duet.

"Cosmic Chaos" is an example of the apparently free but actually conducted blowing for which the Arkestra would become known over the following decades.

The sleeve design

The sleeve, designed by Paul Frick, features a German astronomical chart of the solar system. Beneath it, Frick has placed Sun Ra within a pantheon of astronomers and scientists including Tycho Brahe, Leonardo da Vinci, Copernicus, Galileo and Pythagoras.

Track listing

12" vinyl
All songs by Sun Ra
Side A:
"The Sun Myth" - (17:20)
Side B:
"A House of Beauty" - (5:10)
"Cosmic Chaos" - (14:15)

Recorded November 16, 1965 at Studio RLA, New York.

Personnel
Sun Ra - piano, tuned bongos and clavioline
Marshall Allen - alto saxophone, piccolo, flute
Pat Patrick - baritone saxophone
Walter Miller - trumpet
John Gilmore - tenor saxophone
Robert Cummings - bass clarinet
Ronnie Boykins	- bass
Roger Blank - percussion
Richard L. Alderson - Engineer

See also
Sun Ra discography

References 

1966 albums
Sun Ra albums
ESP-Disk albums